Chaitanya Bishnoi (born 25 August 1994) is an Indian cricketer who plays for Haryana. He made his Twenty20 debut on 6 January 2016 in the 2015–16 Syed Mushtaq Ali Trophy. In January 2018, he was bought by the Chennai Super Kings in the 2018 IPL auction. He was released by the Chennai Super Kings ahead of the 2020 IPL auction.

Bishnoi studied at Durham University, where he represented Durham MCC University in cricket. He also won a half-palantinate in cricket as a member of Hatfield College. His brother, Bhavya Bishnoi, has also played first-class cricket. His parents, Kuldeep and Renuka Bishnoi are politicians in Haryana, and his grandfather, Bhajan Lal, was a Chief Minister.

References

External links
 

1994 births
Living people
Indian cricketers
Haryana cricketers
Cricketers from Delhi
Alumni of Hatfield College, Durham
Chennai Super Kings cricketers
Durham MCCU cricketers